Cucurbita ficifolia is a species of squash, grown for its edible seeds, fruit, and greens. It has common names including Asian pumpkin, black seed squash, chilacayote, cidra, fig-leaf gourd, and Malabar gourd. Compared to other domesticated species in its genus, investigators have noted that samples of C. ficifolia from throughout its range are relatively similar to one other in morphology and genetic composition. Variations do occur in fruit and seed color, some isozymes, and  photoperiod sensitivity.

This species is grown widely from Argentina and Chile to Mexico. It is also cultivated in regions of the world including India, Japan, Korea, China, the Philippines, Ethiopia, Kenya, Tanzania, and Angola.

No named agricultural  cultivars  have been recognized. Research suggests that C. ficifolia represents an earlier evolutionary branch than the other major cultivated Cucurbita species, but biosystematic investigations have established that C. ficifolia is not as distinct from the other domesticated Cucurbita species as early botanists had concluded. It has been noted to form interspecific hybrids with Cucurbita maxima, Cucurbita moschata, and Cucurbita pepo. Interspecific hybrids have generally been infertile beyond the first generation unless techniques such as embryo cultivation are used.

Common names 
 Asian pumpkin
 black-seed squash
 chilacayote
 chiverri
 cidra
 citron chayote
 figleaf gourd, fig-leaf gourd, fig-leaved gourd 
 lacayote
 Malabar gourd
 pie melon
 shark fin gourd or shark fin melon
 Siam squash
 sidra
 Thai marrow
 Victoria

Description 
Early botanical keys described Cucurbita ficifolia as a perennial that is grown as an annual in temperate climates. More recent investigations have found that C. ficifolia is an annual that does not differ in longevity from the other annual domesticated Cucurbita species. As with these other annual species, C. ficifolia can have a vine habit that can root at the nodes. Provided proper conditions including a frost-free climate, it can grow for an indefinite amount of time in this manner. The plant stem can grow five to fifteen meters and produces tendrils that help it climb adjacent plants and structures. Its leaves resemble fig leaves, hence its Latin species name ficifolia, which means fig leaf.

The plant is monoecious with imperfect flowers (meaning its flowers are either male or female but both sexes can be found on the same plant) and are pollinated by insects, especially bees. The color of the flowers is yellow to orange.

In contrast to other domesticated Cucurbita that have highly variable fruit, the fruit of C. ficifolia is uniform in size, shape, and color. The fruit is always oval, resembling a watermelon. This species is the only Curcubita to have black seeds, but some C. ficifolia also have dark brown or buff colored seeds that are similar to other species in the genus. The fruit is oblong with a diameter of eight inches or 20 centimeters, weighs eleven to 13 pounds (5 to 6 kilograms), and can produce up to 500 seeds. Its skin can vary from light or dark green to cream. One plant can produce over 50 fruit. The fruit can last without decomposing for several years if kept dry after harvest.

Non-morphological indications of genetic diversity within the species include its cultivation across a wide geographic range, where altitude is one of the only conditions that is consistent. Another reflection of genetic diversity is that C. ficifolia is grown in a variety of agricultural systems ranging from high competition such as in heavy rain maize fields, to less competitive and more intensive cultivation such as dry season maize fields, vegetable gardens, and commercial agricultural plots. Variations in productivity may also reflect genetic diversity within the species.

Origin and distribution 
It is native to the Americas, although the exact center of domestication is unclear. Linguistic evidence suggests Mexico, because of the wide use of names based on the  Nahuatl name "chilacayohtli" as far south as Argentina. However, archaeological evidence suggests Peru because the earliest remains have been found there.  Biosystematics has been unable to confirm either hypothesis.

Archeological records show that it was once the most widespread variety of Cucurbita in the Americas, cultivated from northern Chile and Argentina Northwest to Mexico. C. ficifolia is believed to have spread first from South America to the Malabar Coast of India in the 16th and 17th centuries before later reaching Europe. Some of its common names including Asian pumpkin, Malabar gourd, Siam squash, and Thai marrow reflect this route of dispersal to Europe.

Cultivation 
It is often used as a grafting rootstock for other less resistant cucurbits. C. ficifolia can be propagated through planting seeds and by layering. Nodes can grow roots, and can propagate new plants once cut. It is not resistant to severe frosts.

Uses

Culinary

Shell and flesh 
The immature fruit is eaten cooked, while the mature fruit is sweet and used to make confectionery and beverages, sometimes alcoholic. The fruit is low in beta-carotene, as can be seen from its white flesh, and is relatively low in vitamins and minerals, and moderately high in carbohydrates.

In Spain this squash is used to make a jam known as "cabello de ángel" (angel's hair), "cabell d'àngel" in Catalan, that is used to fill pies, sweets and confectionery. In Portugal, where the fruit is known as "chila" or "gila", it is used extensively in the production of traditional Portuguese sweets and confectionery.

In Chile jam is often made out of the fruit. In Costa Rica, it is traditional to make empanadas stuffed with sugared filling at Easter time.

In Asia, the pulp strands are used to make soup, quite similar to shark fin soup, hence the name "shark's fin melon". The cultivation and this usage feature briefly in the film Grow Your Own.

Seeds 
The most nutritional part of Cucurbita ficifolia is its fat- and protein-rich seeds.Cilacayote seeds are used in Mexico to make palanquetas, a sweet similar to peanut brittle.

Flowers, leaves, and shoots 
The flowers, leaves and tender shoots are used in Mexico and other countries as greens.

Medicinal 
Across Asia, eating Cucurbita ficifolia is said to help people with diabetes. Several scientific studies have confirmed its hypoglycemic effect. It is used effectively to treat diabetes due to its high D-Chiro-Inositol content.

Animal feed 
The vine and fruit are used for fodder. In Portugal, it has been used to feed pigs.

References

External links 

ficifolia
Edible nuts and seeds
Flora of Argentina
Flora of Chile
Flora of Mexico
Flora of Peru
Squashes and pumpkins